Bernardodon was a small, Lower Cretaceous mammal from Portugal. It is part of the extinct order Multituberculata, living at the same time as the dinosaurs. Differs from Pinheirodon in having I3 wider and more robust; on P5 the cusps of BB row do not extend for the whole tooth length.

References

 Hahn & Hahn (1999), "Pinheirodontidae n. fam. (Multituberculata) (Mammalia) aus der tiefen Unter-Kreide Portugals". Palaeontographica Abt. A Vol. 253, pp. 77–222. 
 Kielan-Jaworowska Z & Hurum JH (2001), "Phylogeny and Systematics of multituberculate mammals". Paleontology 44, p. 389-429.

Cretaceous mammals of Europe
Multituberculates
Prehistoric mammals of Europe
Prehistoric mammal genera
Fossil taxa described in 1999